Sean Matthew Clancy (born October 22, 1956) is a former American football linebacker who played two seasons in the National Football League with the Miami Dolphins and St. Louis Cardinals from 1978 to 1979.

Career
Clancy was drafted by the Dolphins in the 8th round of the 1978 NFL draft out of Amherst College. Clancy would go on to appear in 26 career games for the Dolphins.

References

Living people
1956 births
American football linebackers
Miami Dolphins players
St. Louis Cardinals (football) players
Amherst Mammoths football players
Chaminade High School alumni
Sportspeople from Nassau County, New York